The Last Flight of Noah's Ark is a 1980 American family adventure film produced by Walt Disney Productions starring Elliott Gould, Geneviève Bujold and Ricky Schroder. The film was released by Buena Vista Distribution on July 9, 1980. A full-scale Boeing B-29 Superfortress bomber was featured in the film as the "ark".

Plot
A jaded pilot named Noah Dugan (Elliott Gould) is unemployed and owes a large amount of money due to his gambling. He goes to an old friend, Stoney (Vincent Gardenia), who owns an airfield. He is offered a job flying a cargo of animals to a remote South Pacific island aboard a B-29 bomber, a large plane well past its prime. Bernadette Lafleur (Geneviève Bujold) is the prim missionary who accompanies him. Bernadette has raised the animals at an orphanage and is close to two of the orphans, Bobby (Ricky Schroder) and Julie (Tammy Lauren).

As the aircraft prepares to taxi for takeoff, Bobby is concerned about Dugan's treatment of the animals, and decides to stow away aboard the bomber so that he can make sure his special friends are properly cared for. Julie follows Bobby aboard.  During the flight, the bomber goes off course, and Dugan is forced to crash-land on an uncharted island that Bobby has spotted with his keen eyesight. While on the island, the group meets two elderly Japanese holdout sailors who have lived there alone for 35 years. Dugan treats them as enemies, as the sailors are unaware that World War II is over, but Bernadette wins their friendship and trust. They are able to communicate because the mother of one of the sailors had spent time in America, and she taught her son how to speak English. She even named him "Cleveland", after her favorite place there.

The sailors convince Dugan and Bernadette that there is no hope of rescue should they stay on the island, as the two had been there for decades with no one coming to repatriate them.  They propose a plan to turn the old aircraft into a boat to sail back to civilization.  This requires flipping the B-29 upside down, as this will be a more stable and watertight configuration. Bernadette needs to construct a sail for the boat, so the sailors give her their battle flag of the Japanese Empire, which she uses as the primary fabric for the sail. She tells the soldiers that she will sew it in the top position as a symbol of respect.

Noah and Bernadette (or "Bernie", as he calls her) fall in love after the two had resented each other at first. Bernie paints the name "Noah's Ark" on the converted boat-plane. Dugan tells her that he does not like his first name, but as she starts to remove the paint, he says he is okay with it.  The animals are also brought on board at Bobby's insistence.  Bernadette keeps a Bible close to her.  After many days at sea, she tells Dugan that she has been inspired by the story of Noah's ark in how a dove was sent to search for a sign of hope, so they decide to send their duck with a message attached, telling of their need for rescue. The duck flies westward, away from the direction of Hawaii, and hope dwindles.  Bobby has been resentful of Dugan (since his first mistreatment of the animals), but the two eventually develop a close bond, especially after Dugan saves Bobby's life when the boy falls overboard when they try to fish for food while a big shark is circling them. They are rescued by United States Coast Guard Cutter Mellon, which has the duck aboard, and the Ark is towed to Oahu.

Cast

 Elliott Gould as Noah Dugan
 Geneviève Bujold as Bernadette Lafleur
 Ricky Schroder as Bobby
 Vincent Gardenia as Stoney 
 Tammy Lauren as Julie
 John Fujioka as "Cleveland"
 Yuki Shimoda as Hiro
 Dana Elcar as Benchley
 John P. Ryan as Coslough
 Ruth Manning as Charlotte Braithwaite
 Arthur Adams as Leipzig Manager
 Austin Willis as Slabotsky
 Peter Renaday as Irate Pilot
 Bob Whiting as Chaplain

Production
The main story for the film, "The Gremlin's Castle", was written by Ernest K. Gann, who also wrote the classic aviation novels The High and the Mighty and Fate Is the Hunter, which were also turned into films.

The film was announced in December 1978 as part of Disney's slate of films for the next year. Others included The Watcher in the Woods, Condorman, The Black Hole, and Herbie Goes Bananas.

Ron Miller, head of Disney at the time, deliberately used a director and actors who had not worked with Disney before. "We've got to broaden our base", said producer Dan Miller.

This film reunites director Charles Jarrott with several people he worked with in other films at other studios; he had previously directed Geneviève Bujold in Universal's Anne of the Thousand Days, which had earned them Academy Award nominations. The film's theme song, "Half of Me", had lyrics by Hal David, who also wrote the lyrics to songs to the 1973 Columbia Pictures movie musical Lost Horizon and whose brother Mack David did the same for Walt Disney's 1950 animated feature Cinderella. Meanwhile, both Gould and Bujold were making their first film for Disney, as were Ricky Schroder and Dana Elcar who both appeared in The Champ, which came out on April 4, shortly before this film started shooting on April 22, 1979. Elcar would also appear in Jarrott's next film, Condorman, another Disney release the following year. Schroder, for whom this was also his first film that wasn't a remake of an earlier film, turned nine years old on April 13, exactly nine days between the two aforementioned dates in either direction.

Location photography included scenes at a desert airfield near Victorville, California, Kauai and Waikiki Beach, Hawaii, with interiors shot at the Disney Studios sound stages. The scrapped airframes from four B-29 aircraft that were located at the US Navy's China Lake Facilities were used. Two of the scrapped aircraft were used in Hawaii, while the other two were shipped to the Burbank studio for interiors. Extensive modifications were made in order to have a fuselage that could float. After filming, all the aircraft remains had to be returned to the US Navy. One additional aircraft, the former US Navy P2B-1S long-range-search version of the B-29 Superfortress, named Fertile Myrtle, actually flew in the film.

Reception
The Last Flight of Noah's Ark was released to many drive-in theaters on a double bill with One Hundred and One Dalmatians. The film's promotional slogan was "treat your family to a Disney summer".

Among the reactions from critics, Roger Ebert's  1.5-star review was particularly harsh: "Walt Disney's 'The Last Flight of Noah's Ark' is a dreadful movie, bankrupt of creative imagination—an Identi-kit film, assembled from familiar pieces but with no identity of its own. It's so depressingly predictable that in the last half hour we're sitting there thinking: Let's see…the raft has put out to sea, so there has to be at least one shark attack and one bad storm before they're rescued. There are." Janet Maslin of The New York Times called it "a so-so Disney picture" that was "dull, but inoffensive, except during its infrequent musical interludes." Gene Siskel of the Chicago Tribune gave the film 1 star out of four and wrote, "The inescapable conclusion to be drawn from watching the latest Disney comic adventure film, 'The Last Flight of Noah's Ark,' is that Walt Disney productions had no conception of whom they were making this film for. It's a very bad film that falls in the gap between a kiddie show and adult entertainment." Variety derisively wrote that the film teaches "fundamental values, mainly that every human being should be willing to risk their life for an animal, or even a chicken if the chance arises", and "stresses a subsidiary hint for the little ones: If you don't get your way, whine and cry a lot and maybe the old folks will give in." Charles Champlin of the Los Angeles Times was generally positive, declaring that the film "is in most ways the smooth and satisfying family film out of the Disney past, with cute kids (who are at least as smart as the grown-ups) and a dazzling gimmick at the center of the story." Gary Arnold of The Washington Post wrote, "A low-octane adventure fable, 'Last Flight' keeps sputtering out on the stodgy, overprotective mechanics typical of Disney juvenile entertainment."

Leonard Maltin's home video guide gave it 2.5 stars out of 4 and noted: "Typical Disney sentimentality; somewhat effective."

The film was a box office disappointment. Miller called it a "$6 million write-off."

See also
 The Flight of the Phoenix
 List of surviving Boeing B-29 Superfortresses

References

Notes

Citations

Bibliography

 O'Leary, Michael. "The Last Flight of Noah's Ark". Air Classics, Volume 16, Number 4, April 1980.

External links
 
 
 
 Movie/DVD Review at UltimateDisney.com
 

1980 films
1980s adventure films
American adventure films
American aviation films
1980s English-language films
Films about aviation accidents or incidents
Films directed by Charles Jarrott
Films produced by Ron W. Miller
Films scored by Maurice Jarre
Films set in Oceania
Films set on airplanes
Films set on uninhabited islands
Walt Disney Pictures films
Japanese holdouts
1980s American films